Breznița-Ocol is a commune located in Mehedinți County, Oltenia, Romania. It is composed of four villages: Breznița-Ocol, Jidoștița, Magheru and Șușița.

References

Communes in Mehedinți County
Localities in Oltenia